Sayf al-Din, also Saif al-Din, Sayf/Saif ad-Din, or Sayf/Saif ud-Din etc., may refer to:

Sayf al-Din Suri (died 1149), Ghurid king
Saif ad-Din Ghazi I (died 1149), Zangid emir of Mosul
Ghazi II Saif ud-Din (died 1180), Zangid emir of Mosul
al-Malik al-Adil Sayf al-Din Abu-Bakr ibn Ayyub, or just Al-Adil I, also known as "Saphadin", (1145–1218), Ayyubid sultan of Egypt
Sayf al-Din al-Amidi (died 1233), Islamic jurist
Saifuddin Aibak (died 1236), governor of Bengal
Saif ad-Dīn al-Malik al-ʿĀdil Abū Bakr b. Nāṣir ad-Dīn Muḥammad, or just Al-Adil II (died 1248), Ayyubid sultan of Egypt
Saif ad-Din Qutuz (died 1260), Mamluk sultan of Egypt
Saif ad-Dīn Qalawun aṣ-Ṣāliḥī (c. 1222–1290), Mamluk sultan of Egypt
Saif ad-Din Abu-Bakr (c. 1321–1341), Mamluk sultan of Egypt
Al-Malik Az-Zahir Sayf ad-Din Barquq (died 1399), Burji sultan of Egypt
Saifuddin Hamza Shah (died 1412), fourth Sultan of the first Ilyas dynasty of Bengal
Sayf ad-Din Inal (died 1461) 13th Burji Mamluk sultan of Egypt
Al-Ashraf Sayf al-Din Qaitbay, (c. 1417–1496), Burji Mamluk Sultan of Egypt
Al-Ashraf Sayf-ad-Din Barsbay, (c. 1369–1438), Burji Mamluk Sultan of Egypt
Sayf ad-Din Bilbay, (died 1468), Burji Mamluk Sultan of Egypt
Sayf ad-Din Jaqmaq, (1373–1453), Burji Mamluk Sultan of Egypt
Sayf ad-Din Khushqadam, (1413–1467), Burji Mamluk Sultan of Egypt 
Sayf ad-Din Tatar, (died 1421), Burji Mamluk Sultan of Egypt
Sayf ad-Din Tuman bay I (died after 1501), Burji Mamluk Sultan of Egypt
Omar Ali Saifuddin I (died 1795), Sultan of Brunei
Omar Ali Saifuddin II (died 1852), Sultan of Brunei
Saifuddin Kitchlew (1888–1963), Muslim Indian lawyer and political activist
Taher Saifuddin (1888–1965), leader of the Dawoodi Bohras community
Seif el-Din el-Zoubi (1913–1986), Israeli-Arab politician
Omar Ali Saifuddien III (1914–1986), Sultan of Brunei
Saifuddin Azizi (1915–2003), Uyghur chairman of the people's council of Xinjiang, China
Mohammad Saifuddin (1996),Bangladeshi cricketer
Saifuddin Ahmed (1927–2010), Bangladeshi film actor
Saifuddin Soz (born 1937), Indian academic and politician
Mufaddal Saifuddin (born 1946)
Salih Saif Aldin (c. 1975–2007), Iraqi journalist
Khamis Abdullah Saifeldin (born 1976), Qatari runner
Saifeddine Nejmaoui (born 1981), Tunisian boxer
Saifuddin Nasution Ismail, Malaysian politician
Saifuddin Abdullah, Malaysian politician
Saifuddin Choudhury, Indian politician
Saifuddin or Saif Ahmad, American poker player
The Seif al Din pathogen in Patient Zero: A Joe Ledger Novel

See also
Saif (disambiguation)
Saiful Islam (disambiguation)
Sayf al-Dawla (disambiguation)
Husam al-Din (disambiguation)

Arabic masculine given names